The Roman Catholic Diocese of the Transfiguration at Novosibirsk is a suffragan Latin diocese in the Ecclesiastical province of the Metropolitan Archbishop of Mother of God at Moscow.
 
Its cathedral episcopal see is the Cathedral of the Transfiguration, in the city of Novosibirsk, in Siberia (Asian Russia).

History 
 Established on April 13, 1991 as Apostolic Administration of Novosibirsk, on territory split off from the Diocese of Vladivostok and the newly suppressed Metropolitan Archdiocese of Mohilev
 Renamed on May 18, 1999 as Apostolic Administration of Western Siberia, having lost territory to establish the then Apostolic Administration of Eastern Siberia (now Diocese of Saint Joseph at Irkutsk)
 Promoted and renamed-back on February 11, 2002 as Diocese of the Transfiguration at Novosibirsk

Ordinaries 
(all Roman rite, so far missionary members of Latin congregations)

 Apostolic Administrators of Novosibirsk (Siberia)
 Joseph Werth, Jesuits (S.J.), (1991.04.13 – 1999.05.18 see below), Titular Bishop of Bulna (1991.04.13 – 2002.02.11)
 Jerzy Mazur, Divine Word Missionaries (S.V.D.) (1998.03.23 – 1999.05.18), Titular Bishop of Tabunia (1998.03.23 – 2002.02.11), later Apostolic Administrator of Eastern Siberia (Russia) (1999.05.18 – 2002.02.11), Apostolic Administrator of Yuzhno Sakhalinsk (Russia) (2000 – 2003.04.17), Bishop of Saint Joseph at Irkutsk (Russia) (2002.02.11 – 2003.04.17), Bishop of Ełk (Poland) (2003.04.17 – ...)

 Apostolic Administrator of Western Siberia 
 Joseph Werth, S.J. (see above 1999.05.18 – 2002.02.11 see below)

 Suffragan Bishops of (Transfiguration at) Novosibirsk
 Joseph Werth, S.J. (see above 2002.02.11 - ...), President of  Conference of Catholic Bishops of Russia (2005.02 – 2011.01.19)

Statistics 
As per 2014, it pastorally served 512,000 Catholics (2.0% of 25,600,000 total) on 2,000,000 km² in 70 parishes and 160 missions with 38 priests (19 diocesan, 19 religious), 1 deacon and 77 lay religious (20 brothers, 57 sisters).

Dependent churches include:
 Holy Trinity Church, Tobolsk
 St. Anne's Church, Yekaterinburg
 St. John Chrysostom Church, Novokuznetsk
 St. Joseph's Church, Tyumen
 Church of the Intercession of the Virgin Mary, Tomsk

See also 
 Roman Catholicism in Russia

Sources and external links 
 GCatholic.org, with Google satellite photo
 Catholic Hierarchy
 Siberian Catholic Newspaper - website of the press service of the Diocese of the Transfiguration at Novosibirsk 
 Catholic Church in Western Siberia
 St. Nicholas Catholic Orphanage in Novosibirsk

Novosibirsk
Christian organizations established in 1991
Novosibirsk
Novosibirsk
1991 establishments in Russia
Christianity in Novosibirsk